Elías Hernán Hernández Jacuinde (born 29 April 1988) is a Mexican professional footballer who plays as a winger for Liga MX club León.

Club career
Hernández made his professional debut on October 27, 2007, in a 1–0 win over Tigres UANL, he came off the bench in the 60th minute for former Morelia player Wanderson Da Silva.

Even though Hernández had little playing time at the time, he did score the go ahead goal against Cruz Azul, which Morelia won 2–1. He scored his second goal on August 17, 2008, against UNAM. During the Apertura 2009 and Bicentario 2010 seasons, Hernández helped Morelia reach the semi-finals, scoring 12 goals and registering seven assists in 42 matches. He also played in all six games of the 2010 Copa Libertadores for Morelia, registering three assists.

Cruz Azul
On July 21, 2018, Hernandez debuted with Cruz Azul and scored his 1st goal at the 93rd minute in a 3–0 victory against Puebla.

International career
Hernández got his first call up by interim coach Enrique Meza for a friendly match against Spain. He made his debut in the match coming in the 66th minute for Giovani dos Santos. He scored his first international goal against Colombia on September 7, 2010, which gave Mexico the victory.

Career statistics

International

International goals
Scores and results list Mexico's goal tally first.

Honours
Morelia
North American SuperLiga: 2010

León
Liga MX: Apertura 2013, Clausura 2014
Leagues Cup: 2021

Cruz Azul
Liga MX: Guardianes 2021
Copa MX: Apertura 2018
Supercopa MX: 2019
Leagues Cup: 2019

Mexico
CONCACAF Gold Cup: 2011
CONCACAF Cup: 2015

Individual
Liga MX Best XI: Apertura 2017, Apertura 2018

References

External links
 
 
 

1988 births
Living people
Liga MX players
Atlético Morelia players
C.F. Mérida footballers
C.F. Pachuca players
Tigres UANL footballers
Club León footballers
2011 CONCACAF Gold Cup players
2017 CONCACAF Gold Cup players
CONCACAF Gold Cup-winning players
Association football forwards
Sportspeople from Morelia
Footballers from Michoacán
Mexican footballers
Mexico international footballers